The Latin phrase   (“Of the dead nothing but good is to be said.”) — abbreviated  — is a mortuary aphorism indicating that it is socially inappropriate for the living to speak ill of the dead who cannot defend or justify themselves. 

The full Latin sentence usually is abbreviated into the phrase  (“Of the dead, [say] nothing but good.”); whereas free translations from the Latin function as the English aphorisms: “Speak no ill of the dead.”, “Of the dead, speak no evil.”, and “Do not speak ill of the dead.” 

Attributed to Chilon of Sparta, who was one of the Seven Sages of Greece, the aphoristic recommendation about not speaking ill of the dead was first recorded in Classical Greek, as:  (“Of the dead do not speak ill.”), in chapter 70 of Book 1 of the Lives and Opinions of Eminent Philosophers, by Diogenes Laërtius, in the 4th century AD. The Latin version of the Greek mortuary phrase dates from the translation of the book by Diogenes Laërtius, by the humanist monk Ambrogio Traversari in 1443.

Usages

Literary

Novels
 In The Last Chronicle of Barset (1867), by Anthony Trollope, after the sudden death of the Bishop's wife, the Archdeacon describes  as a proverb "founded in humbug" that only need be followed in public and is unable to bring himself to adopt "the namby-pamby every-day decency of speaking well of one of whom he had ever thought ill."
 In The Power-House (1916), by John Buchan, after destroying the villain, Andrew Lumley, the hero, Sir Edward Leithen, says , an abbreviated version of the phrase, in reference to the dead Lumley.
 In Player Piano (1952), by Kurt Vonnegut, the phrase is used by the narrator after describing individuals "with nothing to lose anyway, men who had fallen into disfavor one way or another, who knew they had received their last invitation" to the Meadows.
 In Deus Irae (1976), by Philip K. Dick and Roger Zelazny, Father Handy thinks of the phrase in reference to millions of people killed by nerve gas.
 In McNally's Dilemma (1999) by [Lawrence Sanders and Vincent Lardo],  McNally the narrator uses the phrase 'De mortuis nil nisi bonum' when a married with a step-daughter playboy George is found murdered. George's reputation was well known in West palm beach Florida and many including his wife would've argued that he got what he deserved.

Short stories
 In "De Mortuis" (1942), by John Collier, after an unwitting cuckold is accidentally informed of his wife's infidelities, he plans an opportunistic revenge; the titular phrase, implies the murderous ending of the story.
 In "EPICAC", by Kurt Vonnegut, after the demise of his friend/project, EPICAC, the supercomputer, the protagonist states the phrase in a memoir of someone who has done great for him.

Poetry

 In "Sunlight on the Sea" (The Philosophy of a Feast), by Adam Lindsay Gordon, the mortuary phrase is the penultimate line of the eighth, and final, stanza of the poem.

Philosophy

 In Thoughts for the Times on War and Death (1915), Sigmund Freud denounced the cultural stupidity that was the First World War (1914–18); yet, in the essay "Our Attitude Towards Death", recognised the humanity of the participants, and the respect owed them in the mortuary phrase .

Cinema
 In the war–adventure film Lawrence of Arabia (1962), the phrase is cautiously used at the funeral of T. E. Lawrence, officiated at St Paul's Cathedral; two men, a clergyman and a soldier, Colonel Brighton, are observing a bust of the dead "Lawrence of Arabia", and commune in silent mourning. The clergyman asks: "Well, . But did he really deserve . . . a place in here?" Colonel Brighton's reply is a pregnant silence.

Theatre

 In The Seagull (1896), by Anton Chekhov, a character mangles the mortuary phrase, conflating it with the maxim  ("About taste there is no disputing"), which results in the mixed mortuary opinion:  ("Let nothing be said of taste, but what is good").
In Julius Caesar (1599) by William Shakespeare, Mark Antony uses what is possibly a perverted form of the phrase , when he says: "The evil that men do lives after them; The good is oft interred with their bones..."

In other languages
Other languages have expressions that have a similar meaning. For example, in Hebrew, one might use  (Aḥare mot k'doshim emor''), which may be translated into: "After the death, say 'they were holy'". The expression is formed by names of three consecutive sedras in Leviticus: Acharei Mot, Kedoshim and Emor, and has been taken to mean that one should not speak ill of the dead.

References

Latin quotations
Death